''So What If the Goats Die (French: Qu'importe si les bêtes meurent), is a 2020 Moroccan short film directed by Sofia Alaoui. It was screened at a number of international film festivals including the Clermont-Ferrand International Short Film Festival, the Sundance Film Festival, and the Namur International Francophone Film Festival, winning multiple awards.

Synopsis 
In the Atlas Mountains, Abdellah, a young shepherd, and his father are stuck in their sheepfold because of the snow. Their livestock are dying, and Abdellah has to get food from a village more than a day's walk away. With his mule, he arrives at the village and discovers that it is deserted because of a curious event.

Cast 

 Saïd Ouabi (Lunatic)
 Fouad Oughaou (Abdellah)
 Moha Oughaou (Father)
 Oumaïma Oughaou (Itto)

External links

References 

2020 films
2020 short films